Kira S. Makarova is an Estonian-American evolutionary biologist known for her research on the biology of CRISPR and Cas9. She is a staff scientist at the National Center for Biotechnology Information.

Early life and education
Makarova grew up in Narva, then part of the Soviet Union and later in Estonia, and competed at the national level in the Soviet Biology Olympiad. After completing high school she tried unsuccessfully for several years to enter Moscow State University. She instead entered the Moscow Medical Institute, but after marrying and having a child she moved to Novosibirsk State University to be closer to her husband's family. There, the shortages of laboratory supplies led her to work in computational biology. She completed a master's degree in 1991, and in 1996 completed a doctorate at the Institute of Cytology and Genetics of the Russian Academy of Sciences in Novosibirsk. Her work at the institute involved the design of synthetic oligonucleotides and, separately, the use of oligopeptide frequency data to classify proteins.

Later career and research
When Makarova's husband moved to the US to work with Eugene Koonin in the National Center for Biotechnology Information, Koonin found Makarova a position as research fellow at the Uniformed Services University of the Health Sciences, studying Deinococcus radiodurans, a bacterium that can survive highly extreme conditions. In 2001, Koonin hired Makarova to join him at the National Center for Biotechnology Information. At the center, beginning in 2006, Makarova and her co-workers investigated the CRISPR-Cas9 system and its biological function as a bacterial immune system. Interest in the system heightened after other researchers subsequently used it to perform genome editing.

Makarova's ongoing research involves comparative genomics, and the genetics and protein functions of archaea. She is the maintainer of a database of archaeal proteins and their relations.

References

External links

Year of birth missing (living people)
Living people
Estonian biologists
20th-century American biologists
21st-century American biologists
American women biologists
National Institutes of Health people
20th-century American women scientists
21st-century American women scientists
Novosibirsk State University alumni
Estonian emigrants to the United States
Estonian women scientists
Computational biologists
Evolutionary biologists
Women computational biologists
Women evolutionary biologists